Character Carousel is a classic carousel ride that is themed towards children.  The theme of the ride coordinates with Cedar Fair's kid's areas, Planet Snoopy.  It is located at three parks, and the design may be varied by each park.

Locations
Character Carousel at Canada's Wonderland
Character Carousel at Carowinds
Character Carousel at Kings Island